"If I Had a Gun..." is a song by the English rock band Noel Gallagher's High Flying Birds, written by frontman Noel Gallagher from their self-titled debut studio album Noel Gallagher's High Flying Birds (2011). It was released as the third single on 26 December 2011 in all regions bar the United Kingdom. As with the band's other single releases, Strangeboy Stacey engineered and mixed the B-side. The song impacted US radio on 13 September 2011.

The track features Jon Graboff on second guitar (credited as the Pedal Steel in the sleeve notes).

Background
Written in Lima, Peru and originally intended to be the lead single off the album, "If I Had a Gun..." was passed over in favour of "The Death of You and Me," as Gallagher thought it sounded too much like his previous band, Oasis. Gallagher described the song as "emotionally uplifting and up there with the best I've wrote".

The song first surfaced on the Internet when Gallagher was recorded playing it at a soundcheck in Taiwan in April 2009 during the Asian leg of Oasis' Dig Out Your Soul world tour.

Music video
Filmed in Los Angeles, California, the music video for "If I Had a Gun..." is centered on a wedding ceremony with Gallagher acting as the priest. During the ceremony a cowboy on a horse arrives and dives into a swimming pool and the bride (Peyton List) follows him and they ride off into the sunset on the horse. Visible at 3:27 are the two women and the "Soulsucker" video camera from the "AKA... What a Life!" music video.

The video appears to be part of a three-video story starting with "If I Had a Gun...", then "The Death of You and Me" and ending with "AKA... What a Life!" as all the videos begin where the other one finished. The videos, however, were not released in chronological order, as the singles came out in a different order.

At the end of the video, Gallagher pulls up in a van outside the same diner he's featured in during "The Death of You and Me." While in the background, as he's walking toward the door, there is a preview of "Shoot a Hole into the Sun," the remixed version of "If I Had a Gun...," from Gallagher's cancelled 2012 collaboration album with Amorphous Androgynous.

The video was directed and produced by Mike Bruce, with producers Blake West and Camille LaBry of United Film House.

Chart performance and reception
As of the chart week ending 21 January 2012, "If I Had a Gun..." had peaked at number 95 in the UK Singles Chart. It was also successful in Japan, peaking at number two on the Japan Hot 100, on the week of 29 October 2011 (and stayed on the chart for many weeks before and after). It ranked at number 77 on the end-of-the-year chart of the Japan Hot 100.

For much of 6 May 2012 and 7 May 2012, "If I Had a Gun..." was the No. 1 Trending Topic worldwide on Twitter. The Trending Topic originated in Buenos Aires, Argentina during Gallagher's concert there on the night of 6 May 2012.

Track listing
CD, 7" JDNCSCD11
"If I Had a Gun..." – 4:18
"I'd Pick You Every Time" – 2:11

Digital download JDNCSCD11
"If I Had a Gun..." – 4:18
"I'd Pick You Every Time" – 2:11
"If I Had a Gun..." (music video) – 4:47

Charts

Certifications

References

2011 singles
Songs written by Noel Gallagher
Noel Gallagher's High Flying Birds songs
Song recordings produced by Dave Sardy
Song recordings produced by Noel Gallagher